Sri Ranga Neethulu is a 1983 Indian Telugu-language comedy film, produced by Venkat Akkineni, Nagarjuna Akkineni under the Annapurna Studios banner and directed by A. Kodandarami Reddy. It stars Akkineni Nageswara Rao and Sridevi, with music composed by Chakravarthy. It is a remake of the Tamil film Ooty Varai Uravu (1967). The film was recorded as a Super Hit at the box office.

Plot 
Narayana Murthy is a multi-millionaire and a well-respected person in society who always preaches the principles of righteousness to the public. He leads a happy family life with his wife, Janaki, son, Rajesh, and daughter, Shanthi. Narayana Murthy exiles his daughter from the family for marrying a Christian man, John. But in reality, Narayana Murthy is having a second wife Shobha along with a daughter Lakshmi which no one knows. After her mother's death, Lakshmi decides to reach her father. Meanwhile, Vijaya belongs to a wealthy family and runs away from the house to escape an unwilling marriage done by her maternal uncle Chalapathi. On the way, her taxi hits Lakshmi, due to fear of the police, she leaves her on the road and leaves. Rajesh passes by and takes her to a hospital.

Vijaya reaches the railway station and observes she contains Lakshmi's luggage too when she opens it, finds evidence of Narayana Murthy and Shobha's marriage. Needing a place to stay, she decides to go to Narayana Murthy by claiming herself as his daughter Lakshmi. Unfortunately, she meets Rajesh on the train while traveling Rajesh learns of his father's second family. After that, Vijaya meets Narayana Murthy, and confronts him, so, he accepts the charges and introduces Vijaya as his friend's daughter to everyone. After some time, Rajesh realizes the truth and reveals it to Vijaya. Now Rajesh decides to teach a lesson to his father, so, he tells Vijaya to continue acting as his father's daughter. There onwards, Rajesh starts teasing his father by playing a drama that he is loving Vijaya where both of them truly fall in love. Meanwhile, Lakshmi reaches her lover Ravi and seeks his help. Since he is afraid of his mother Raja Rajeswari Devi he keeps Lakshmi in his close friend's house none other than John.

Dr. Sundara Murthy Narayana Murthy's family doctor looks at the paper advertisement given by Chalapathi and tries to find out her realness. Eventually, Rajesh meets Lakshmi in John's house with Ravi. Being he is also Ravi's friend, tries to help the couple without revealing his identity. Here they play another drama for the acceptance of Ravi & Lakshmi's marriage from Raja Rajeswari Devi. After a few comic incidents, they make her agree to their marriage where Rajesh cleverly plans Vijaya's marriage with him on the same day. Once Lakshmi and Ravi visit Rajesh's house to invite Narayana Murthy to the marriage when she recognizes him, Rajesh explains to her that everything will be set right after their marriage. During the time of the wedding a little bust-up, Dr. Sundara Murthy's wife Bhanu informs Chalapathi about the whereabouts of Vijaya and he kidnaps her. However, Rajesh rescues her and returns to the wedding venue. Narayana Murthy, who attends Ravi's wedding is shocked to see that Rajesh is marrying Vijaya / Lakshmi. Pushed into a corner, Narayana Murthy is forced to confess that Lakshmi is his daughter. Rajesh then steps forward and brings out all the truths. Finally, the movie ends on a happy note with both the marriages.

Cast 
Akkineni Nageswara Rao as Rajesh
Sridevi as Vijaya / Lakshmi
Satyanarayana as Narayana Murthy
Chandra Mohan as Ravi
Vijayashanti as Lakshmi
Nagesh as Dr. Sundara Murthy
Chalapathi Rao as Chalapathi
Ramji as John
Chitti Babu as Astrologer Daivadinam
Pandari Bai as Janaki
S. Varalakshmi as Raja Rajeswari Devi
Rama Prabha as Bhanu
Athili Lakshmi as Shobha
Ragini as Shanthi

Soundtrack 
Music composed by Chakravarthy.

References

External links 
 

1980s Telugu-language films
1983 comedy films
1983 films
Films directed by A. Kodandarami Reddy
Films scored by K. Chakravarthy
Indian comedy films
Telugu remakes of Tamil films